Two ships of the Austro-Hungarian Navy have been named SMS Tegetthoff after the Austrian admiral Wilhelm von Tegetthoff:

 , a central battery ironclad launched in 1878 and serving as a local defence battleship and training vessel during World War I after being renamed Mars.

Austro-Hungarian Navy ship names